The Battle of the Gianh River was a naval clash between the Dutch East India Company (VOC) navy and the Vietnamese Nguyen navy that took place off the coast of Gulf of Tonkin, at the mouth of the Gianh River. The Dutch fleet was in coordination with the northern lord Trịnh Tráng to assault the Nguyens in the south, but a Nguyen fleet commanded by prince Nguyễn Phúc Tần pursued the Dutch fleet and engaged them on the Gianh River, resulting in a Nguyen victory. This was the first time a Vietnamese navy defeating a European navy.

Background
The Dutch East India Company (VOC) had conflicted with Nguyen-ruled Cochinchina (southern Dai Viet) since 1641 because of their alliance with Trinh lords in the north who was fighting in a civil war against their rivals, the Nguyen clan in the south. As the two domains' war raged, lord Trịnh Tráng welcomed the VOC arrival in northern Dai Viet in 1637 while the Nguyens were hostile to the Dutch, but allied with the Dutch's main rival, the Portuguese. In 1639 Trịnh Tráng sent his envoys to van Diemen's VOC base in Batavia, sought for establish a military alliance with the Company in exchange for trading privileges for the Dutch in his Tonkin domain. In the same year he also sent letter to Dutch governor of Formosa Van der Burch to assist his military campaign against the formidable Nguyen. Finally, as tension mounting between the Nguyen domain and the company (the Nguyen jailed several Dutch representatives and sailors), the VOC headquarter in Batavia agreed to ally with the Trinh lords and began to get involved in the war. In late May 1642 five VOC warships with 222 men led by Jan van Linga raided central Vietnam coast possessed by the Nguyen domain, burned houses, seized civilians as hostages, before heading north to join with Trinh army. At the Chàm Island off the coast of Quảng Nam, the VOC fleet were repulsed, which received ten casualties and its captain Jacob van Liesvelt killed. The Nguyen lord then finally released all Dutch captives in the next year. 50 Dutch prisoners along with captain Joris Welten were allowed to sail back to Java on 19 May 1643 on a junk, but two days later a Portuguese warship attacked the junk, killed 32 Dutchmen, 14 able to survive, and only one made way back to Batavia.

In January 1643, five VOC warships with 290 soldiers and sailors from Formosa, led by general Johannes Lamotius, arrived at Tonkin, expected to join with the Trinh army to attack Cochinchina later that year, however after five days, the Dutch withdrew and left one ship to support the Trinh, after acknowledged that the lord was not eager to launch the campaign during spring season. In summer, Batavia sent three warships Wijdenes, Waterhond and Vos, led by captain Pieter Baeck, to the Gianh River to join with Trinh forces. The Trinh army consisting of 10,000 men and a large fleet (commanded by Trịnh Tráng's son Trịnh Tạc and assisted by Issak Davids) in Hà Tĩnh, readied to attack the Nguyen once the VOC fleet arrive.

Course of battle
As the VOC galleons sailed around the Central Vietnamese coast, the Nguyen lord's son-prince Nguyễn Phúc Tần dispatched 50 to 60 smaller junks to pursuit the VOC warships and then battled with them in five miles south of the gateway of the Gianh River. The Nguyen fleet consisted of small junks that were only capable of short-distance coastal sailing, compared to ocean-going Dutch galleons. A fierce battle was engaged: the Dutch opened fire at the Nguyen fleet and sunk seven of them. The Nguyen then shot back at the Dutch galleons. One Nguyen bullet hit the arsenal of the Wijdenes, igniting its gunpowder in a huge explosion that blasted the ship apart, and Baeck was killed. The two other VOC warships were damaged and forced to flee to the Gulf of Tonkin. The Trinh army were stationed very near the battle, and could hear intense gunfire, but did not come to help the VOC fleet. Jan van Elseracq meanwhile in a letter to the Trinh lords, claimed that the Dutch warships were victors, having inflicted 800 casualties on the Nguyen, and sunk seven Nguyen junks.

Aftermath
The Trinh lords, disappointed at the unexpected allied naval losses, aborted the campaign. The Dutch then made a brief blockade of Hoi An in 1644 and tried to pressure the Nguyen lord to release 14 Dutch prisoners. By 1651 the VOC finally achieved peace with lord Nguyễn Phúc Tần, and stopping any further military alliance with the Trinh lords. The Trinh regime fell into internal strife as two frustrated brothers of Trịnh Tạc fought against him in a succession conflict that turned into bloody mobs through the streets of Hanoi in 1645 after the military withdrawal of the Dutch.

See also
 Cambodian–Dutch War
 Sino-Dutch conflicts
 Battle of Liaoluo Bay
 Trịnh–Nguyễn War
 Siege of Fort Zeelandia

Notes
1. Verclaringh van den corporael Juriaen de Rooden aengaende de cru eliteijt bij de Macaose Portugeesen aen de 50 Nederlanders bij den coningh van Quinam gelargeert gepleeght.
2. VOC 1149, Getranslateerden brieff van den Toncquinsen coninq aen den gouverneur generael 
3. Missive van Van Elseracq [in Nagasaki] aen den grootmachtigen coninck van Annam, Chotsingh (Trịnh Tráng).

References

Bibliography

Further reading
A Vietnamese Lord’s letter to the East India Company Asian and African studies blog of the British Library.

Military history of the Dutch East India Company
Gianh River
Gianh River
17th century in Vietnam
Gianh River